Mikael Ahlén (born April 14, 1988) is a Swedish former professional ice hockey player. He played with Djurgårdens IF Hockey in the Swedish Hockey League (SHL).

Ahlén made his Elitserien debut playing with Djurgårdens IF Hockey during the 2006–07 Elitserien season. Following a single season with Södertälje SK of the HockeyAllsvenskan in 2018–19, Ahlén announced his retirement from hockey after 12 professional seasons.

References

External links

1988 births
Djurgårdens IF Hockey players
Huddinge IK players
IF Troja/Ljungby players
Living people
Medicine Hat Tigers players
Södertälje SK players
Swedish ice hockey right wingers